Rolando Araya Monge (born 20 August 1947) is a Costa Rican politician.  He is a nephew of former president Luis Alberto Monge.

Biography 
Rolando Araya went to school in Palmares, the place he was born, and at the Lincoln Park High School, Michigan. In 1970 after his university career at the University of Costa Rica, he graduated as an engineer.
Just four years later he was elected as congressman in Alajuela. Another year passing by, he became President of the Juventud Liberacionista, the youth organization of the PLN, one of the major parties in Costa Rica. In 1978 he also became Vice-President of the supranational youth organization International Union of Socialist Youth.
Only after another four years, Araya entered the cabinet of his uncle President Luis Alberto Monge as minister for public works and transportation.  Two years later he left the government for becoming general secretary of his party PLN. In 1993 he decided to run for presidency, but failed in his party primaries. In 1995 he finally was elected as president of the PLN, a year later Rolando Araya served as Vice-President for the Socialist International.
In 2002 Araya run  for the presidency again, this time he succeeded  in the presidential primary, but he lost the general election.
Rolando Araya was one of the founders of the movement Frente Socialdemócrata Costarricense.

References

1947 births
Living people
People from Palmares (canton)
National Liberation Party (Costa Rica) politicians
Members of the Legislative Assembly of Costa Rica
University of Costa Rica alumni